Wesley Burton (born November 4, 1980) is an American professional stock car racing driver. He has competed part-time in the NASCAR Truck Series, making twelve starts between 2009 and 2012. In his years without a ride in that series, he has occasionally competed in late model racing events, particularly in the PASS Series.

Racing career

NASCAR

Late model racing
Prior to reaching NASCAR, Burton raced late models, which included when he raced in the ASALMS Southern Division in 2007 for Riddler Racing in the team's No. 5 and No. 57 entries.

Since his last start in NASCAR in 2012, Burton has competed in various late model events, including in the PASS Series in his No. 13 car. In 2016, he competed in the series' race at Anderson Motor Speedway in a No. 5X car and finished seventh. In 2019, he competed in the series' Easter Bunny 150 at Hickory Motor Speedway and finished 27th.

Personal life
He owns Wes Burton Shocks and Performance, which provides those parts and pieces to late model teams. One of the teams that his company works with is the CARS Late Model Stock Tour No. 63 car, which is owned and driven by current part-time NASCAR driver Tyler Matthews.

Motorsports career results

NASCAR
(key) (Bold – Pole position awarded by qualifying time. Italics – Pole position earned by points standings or practice time. * – Most laps led.)

Camping World Truck Series

References

External links
 
 Wes Burton Performance website

NASCAR drivers
Living people
Racing drivers from Florida
People from Levy County, Florida
1980 births